La bambina dalle mani sporche ("The little girl with dirty hands") is a 2005 two-parts television drama film. It is based on the novel with the same name written by Giampaolo Pansa.

Cast
  Sebastiano Somma as Giulio Guala  
  Ornella Muti as  Wanda Rosso 
   Michelle Bonev   as Elena
   Remo Girone  as  Celeste Cuchi 
  Giuliano Gemma  as  Procurer Concato
  Bruno Bilotta as Mastino 
   Maurizio Trombini as Cesare 
  Eleanora Martinelli as  Chiara
  Nicola Di Pinto as  The Crow
 Vincent Schiavelli as  Silva Roibes
  Remo Remotti as  Notaio
   Federica Martinelli as  Beatrice
   Philippe Leroy as Ciutti

References 

Italian-language television
Italian television films
2005 television films
2005 films
Films based on Italian novels
Films directed by Renzo Martinelli
2000s Italian films